Madan-e Gol Gohar (also Romanized as Ma‘dan-e Gol Gohar) is a village in Sharifabad Rural District, in the Central District of Sirjan County, Kerman Province, Iran. At the 2006 census, its population was 291, in 40 families.

References 

Populated places in Sirjan County